Samuel Salmi (born 19 March 1951) is a Finnish prelate who was bishop of the Diocese of Oulu from 2001 to 2018.

Biography
Born in Muonio, Salmi graduated from the Faculty of Theology at the University of Helsinki in 1974. He was ordained to the priesthood in Oulu in 1974, after which he completed a pastoral diploma in Oulu Cathedral in 1976. He completed the upper pastoral examination in Oulu Cathedral in 1983. Salmi became a Licentiate of Theology at the University of Helsinki in 1983, where he continued his studies and completed his doctoral thesis in 1990 with his dissertation "One Lord, One Faith, One Baptism". The synod dissertation in the diocese of Oulu was born in 1984 on "The Baptism Key to the Unity of the Churches". He has been a fellow of the World Council of Churches in Geneva in 1976 and 1986. Before becoming bishop, Salmi, was parish priest of the church of the Catherine of Turin from 1993 till 2000. In 2000, he was also the provincial councilor of the Turku Maritime Council.

Bishop
In 2001 he was elected as Bishop of Oulu and succeeded Olavi Rimpiläinen. Unlike his predecessor, Salmi welcomed the female priesthood and the first female priests of the Oulu Diocese were ordained in his first priestly ordination as bishop. Salmi was the first bishop who was appointed by the Church council rather than the Finnish government as a result of the new constitution that came into force on 1 March 2000 that established a separation between the Evangelical Lutheran Church of Finland and the state. Salmi was one of the candidates nominated for Archbishop of Turku in 2010 and received the fifth highest number of votes. He retired on 1 November 2018.

Publications 
 Yksi Herra, yksi usko, yksi kaste: partisipaatio ajatuksen tulkinnat Faith and Order -liikkeen kastedialogeissa Lundista 1955 Budapestiin 1989, Helsinki 1990, ISBN 951-9111-82-4 (dissertation).
 Puhu, pohjoinen, puhu, Pohjan väylä, 2002, ISBN 952-5271-09-9.
 Article in Meille Annettu Maa: Pohjoisen kirkon ympäristökirja, ed. by Timo Helenius, Edita Publishing Oy, 2007, ISBN 978-951-37-4867-8.
 Kuule pohjoista puhetta, Edita Publishing Oy, 2008, ISBN 978-951-37-5308-5.

Family 
Wife - Hannele Salmi (née - Zeitlinger German Zeitlinger)

Son - Mikko Salmi (born 1975), Lutheran pastor, musician, singer

Daughter - Johanna Salmi (born 1982)

References 

Finnish Lutheran bishops
1951 births
Living people